Tudur ap Gwyn Hagr was a Welsh-language poet from south-west Wales.

Bibliography
R. Iestyn Daniel (ed.), Gwaith Dafydd y Coed a beirdd eraill o Lyfr Coch Hergest (Aberystwyth, 2002). 

14th-century Welsh poets